

Men's events

Medal table

 
1983
Events at the 1983 Pan American Games